The following is the list of squads that took place in the men's field hockey tournament at the 1992 Summer Olympics.

Argentina
The following players represented Argentina:

 Emanuel Roggero
 Marcelo Garrafo
 Adrián Mandarano
 Diego Allona
 Rodolfo Pérez
 Edgardo Pailos
 Fernando Falchetto
 Alejandro Siri
 Carlos Geneyro
 Gabriel Minadeo
 Fernando Ferrara
 Pablo Moreira
 Aldo Ayala
 Martín Sordelli
 Daniel Ruiz
 Pablo Lombi

Australia
The following players represented Australia:

 Warren Birmingham
 David Wansbrough
 John Bestall
 Lee Bodimeade
 Ashley Carey
 Stephen Davies
 Damon Diletti
 Lachlan Dreher
 Lachlan Elmer
 Dean Evans
 Greg Corbitt
 Paul Lewis
 Graham Reid
 Jay Stacy
 Ken Wark
 Michael York

Egypt
The following players represented Egypt:

 Mohamed El-Sayed Tantawy
 Ibrahim Mahmoud Tawfik
 Hussain Mohamed Hassan
 Hisham Moustafa Korany
 Gamal Fawzi Mohamed
 Abdel Khlik Abou El-Yazi
 Magdy Ahmed Abdullah
 Gamal Ahmed Abdulla
 Ashraf Shafik Gindy
 Gamal Amin Abdel Ghani
 Amro El-Sayed Osman
 Ehab Moustafa Mansour
 Mohamed Sayed Abdulla
 Amro El-Sayed Mohamady
 Mohamed Samir Mohamed
 Wael Fahim Mostafa

Germany
The following players represented Germany:

 Michael Knauth
 Christopher Reitz
 Jan-Peter Tewes
 Carsten Fischer
 Christian Blunck
 Stefan Saliger
 Michael Metz
 Christian Mayerhöfer
 Sven Meinhardt
 Andreas Keller
 Michael Hilgers
 Andreas Becker
 Stefan Tewes
 Klaus Michler
 Volker Fried
 Oliver Kurtz

Great Britain
The following players represented Great Britain:

 Sean Rowlands
 Sam Martin
 Paul Bolland
 Simon Nicklin
 Jon Potter
 Jason Laslett
 Robert Hill
 Steve Batchelor
 Russell Garcia
 John Shaw
 Nicky Thompson
 Sean Kerly
 Robert Clift
 Jason Lee
 Donald Williams

India
The following players represented India:

 Cheppudira Poonacha
 Jagdev Singh Rai
 Harpreet Singh
 Sukhjit Singh
 Shakeel Ahmed
 Mukesh Kumar Nandanoori
 Jude Sebastian
 Jagbir Singh
 Dhanraj Pillay
 Didar Singh
 Ashish Kumar Ballal
 Pargat Singh
 Ravi Nayakar
 Darryl D'Souza
 Ajit Lakra

Malaysia
The following players represented Malaysia:

 Ahmed Fadzil
 Paul Lopez
 Tai Beng Hai
 Suppiah Suria Ghandi
 Lim Chiow Chuan
 Sarjit Singh Kyndan
 Gary Fidelis
 Brian Jaya Siva
 Shankar Ramu
 Nor Saiful Zaini Nasir-ud-Din
 Dharma Raj Kanniah
 Mohamed Abdul Hadj
 Mirnawan Nawawi
 Lailin Abu Hassan
 Soon Mustafa bin Karim
 Aanantha Sambu Mayavo

Netherlands
The following players represented the Netherlands:

 Frank Leistra
 Harrie Kwinten
 Cees Jan Diepeveen
 Pieter van Ede
 Bastiaan Poortenaar
 Wouter van Pelt
 Marc Delissen
 Jacques Brinkman
 Gijs Weterings
 Stephan Veen
 Floris Jan Bovelander
 Hendrik Jan Kooijman
 Bart Looije
 Maarten van Grimbergen
 Leo Klein Gebbink
 Taco van den Honert

New Zealand
The following players represented New Zealand:

 Peter Daji
 Brett Leaver
 David Grundy
 Scott Hobson
 Grant McLeod
 Peter Miskimmin
 Paresh Patel
 David Penfold
 John Radovonich
 Craig Russ
 Greg Russ
 Umesh Parag
 Jamie Smith
 Anthony Thornton
 Scott Anderson
 Ian Woodley

Pakistan
The following players represented Pakistan:

 Shahid Ali Khan
 Mujahid Ali Rana
 Khalid Bashir
 Anjum Saeed
 Farhat Hassan Khan
 Khawaja Junaid
 Muhammad Qamar Ibrahim
 Tahir Zaman
 Akhlaq Ahmed
 Shahbaz Ahmed
 Wasim Feroz
 Mansoor Ahmed
 Muhammad Khalid
 Asif Bajwa
 Musaddiq Hussain
 Muhammad Shahbaz

Spain
The following players represented Spain:

 Santiago Grau
 Ignacio Escudé
 Kim Malgosa
 Miguel Ortego
 Juantxo García-Mauriño
 Jaume Amat
 Jorge Avilés
 Pedro Jufresa
 José Antonio Iglesias
 Xavier Escudé
 Javier Arnau
 Víctor Pujol
 Juan Antonio Dinarés
 David Freixa
 Pablo Usoz
 Ramón Jufresa

Unified Team
The following players represented the Unified Team:

 Vladimir Pleshakov
 Viktor Deputatov
 Igor Yulchiyev
 Sos Hayrapetyan
 Yury Safonov
 Vladimir Antakov
 Yevgeny Nechayev
 Aleksandr Krasnoyartsev
 Viktor Sukhikh
 Sergey Pleshakov
 Berikkazy Seksenbayev
 Aleksandr Domashev
 Sergey Barabashin
 Oleg Khandayev
 Igor Muladyanov

References

1992